The 1995 season was the third in the history of the Colorado Rockies, a Major League Baseball (MLB) franchise located in Denver, Colorado. It was also their third season in the National League, and first at Coors Field. The team competed in the National League West, finishing with a record of 77−67, second in the division.  The Rockies simultaneously won the first-ever National League wild card berth in the first season of the revised postseason format and first postseason appearance in franchise history.  They faced the eventual World Series champion Atlanta Braves in the National League Division Series (NLDS), who won this first round series in four games, with the Rockies taking game three.

Offseason
December 5, 1994: Drafted Bobby Jones from the Milwaukee Brewers in the 1994 Rule 5 draft.
December 15, 1994: Joe Grahe was signed as a free agent by the Colorado Rockies.
April 8, 1995: Signed free agent starting pitcher Bill Swift and right fielder Larry Walker.
April 10, 1995: Marcus Moore was traded by the Colorado Rockies to the Cincinnati Reds for Chris Sexton.

Regular season
The start to the 1995 MLB regular season was delayed over three weeks by the 1994–95 Major League Baseball strike that ended on April 2.  As a result, the season only lasted 144 games (instead of the typical 162 game season) and "official" opening day for Coors Field was changed to April 26.  The Colorado Rockies played two exhibition games on April 2 and 3 against the New York Yankees as the first baseball to be played at Coors Field.

In his Rockies debut and inaugural game of Coors Field on April 26 versus the New York Mets, Larry Walker doubled three times, including one that tied the score with two outs in the ninth inning.  Dante Bichette hit a walk-off home run in the fourteenth inning for an 11−9 win.  On May 7, 1995, Walker hit his 100th career home run versus Hideo Nomo of Los Angeles.

The Rockies led the NL in hits (1,406), runs scored (785), triples (43, also the most in the majors), home runs (200), runs batted in (749), batting average (.282) and slugging percentage (.471). Conversely, they also allowed the most hits (1,443), runs (783), earned runs (711) and produced the fewest shutouts (1).

A quartet of Rockies hitters who became known as "The Blake Street Bombers", consisting of Dante Bichette, Vinny Castilla, Andrés Galarraga (Walker's former Expos teammate), and Larry Walker, each contributed at least 30 home runs in 1995.  The Rockies simultaneously won the first-ever National League wild card berth under the revised postseason format and first playoff appearance in franchise history in just their third season of play.

On October 1 for the final regular season game, the Rockies needed a win at Coors Field versus the San Francisco Giants to avoid playing a tie-breaker game with the Houston Astros for the National League Wild Card post-season berth.  Using seven pitchers during the nine inning game, Curt Leskanic earned his 10th save and threw the final pitch of the game in a 10–9 victory for the Rockies.  During a post-season interview, Leskanic recalled the pitching mound shaking like a mild earthquake with the vibrations from fans in the stadium anticipating their first ever appearance in the MLB post-season.

During the playoffs, Larry Walker collected three hits in 14 at bats in the National League Division Series (NLDS) versus the Atlanta Braves.  He hit his first career postseason home run off Tom Glavine in the sixth inning of a 7−4 Game 2 loss.  The Braves defeated the Rockies in four games.

Season standings

Wild Card standings

Record vs. opponents

Transactions

June 1, 1995: Todd Helton was drafted by the Colorado Rockies in the 1st round of the 1995 amateur draft. Player signed July 1, 1995.
June 1, 1995: Ben Petrick was drafted by the Colorado Rockies in the 2nd round of the 1995 amateur draft. Player signed August 9, 1995.
July 31, 1995: Bret Saberhagen was traded by the New York Mets with a player to be named later to the Colorado Rockies for Juan Acevedo and Arnold Gooch (minors). The New York Mets sent David Swanson (minors) (August 4, 1995) to the Colorado Rockies to complete the trade.

Major League debuts
Batters:
Jason Bates (Apr 26)
Jorge Brito (Apr 30)
Craig Counsell (Sep 17)
Quinton McCracken (Sep 17)
Pitchers:
Roger Bailey (Apr 27)
Juan Acevedo (Apr 30)
Bryan Rekar (Jul 19)

Roster

Game log 

|-  style="text-align:center; background:#bfb;"
| 1 || April 26 || Mets || 11–9 (14) || Thompson (1–0) || Remlinger (0–1) || || 47,228 || 1–0
|-  style="text-align:center; background:#bfb;"
| 2 || April 27 || Mets || 8–7 || Reed (1–0) || Lomon (0–1) || || 38,087 || 2–0
|-  style="text-align:center; background:#bfb;"
| 3 || April 28 || @ Astros || 2–1 || Leskanic (1–0) || Kile (0–1) || Ruffin (1) || 30,405 || 3–0
|-  style="text-align:center; background:#bfb;"
| 4 || April 29 || @ Astros || 2–1 || Olivares (1–0) || Hampton (0–1) || Ruffin (2) || 19,074 || 4–0
|-  style="text-align:center; background:#fbb;"
| 5 || April 30 || @ Astros || 3–1 || Brocail (1–0) || Leskanic (1–1) || Hudek (1) || 14,455 || 4–1
|-

|-  style="text-align:center; background:#bfb;"
| 6 || May 1 || Padres || 8–3 || Holmes (1–0) || Mauser (0–1) || || 40,117 || 5–1
|-  style="text-align:center; background:#bfb;"
| 7 || May 2 || Padres || 6–5 (11) || Bailey (1–0) || Williams (0–1) || || 38,387 || 6–1
|-  style="text-align:center; background:#bfb;"
| 8 || May 3 || Padres || 12–7 || Bailey (2–0) || Hamilton (0–1) || Ruffin (3) || 37,193 || 7–1
|-  style="text-align:center; background:#fbb;"
| 9 || May 5 || Dodgers || 6–4 || Martínez (2–1) || Olivares (1–1) || Seánez (3) || 46,395 || 7–2
|-  style="text-align:center; background:#fbb;"
| 10 || May 6 || Dodgers || 17–11 || Williams (1–0) || Acevedo (0–1) || || 48,394 || 7–3
|-  style="text-align:center; background:#fbb;"
| 11 || May 7 || Dodgers || 12–10 || Daal (2–0) || Reed (1–1) || Valdez (1) || 48,117 || 7–4
|-  style="text-align:center; background:#bfb;"
| 12 || May 9 || Giants || 10–6 || Ritz (1–0) || Wilson (2–1) || || 41,307 || 8–4
|-  style="text-align:center; background:#bfb;"
| 13 || May 10 || Giants || 8–5 || Holmes (2–0) || Bautista (0–1) || || 43,690 || 9–4
|-  style="text-align:center; background:#bfb;"
| 14 || May 11 || Giants || 10–4 || Acevedo (1–1) || Mulholland (2–2) || Reed (1) || 45,609 || 10–4
|-  style="text-align:center; background:#bfb;"
| 15 || May 12 || @ Marlins || 10–6 || Swift (1–0) || Gardner (0–4) || Ruffin (4) || 22,267 || 11–4
|-  style="text-align:center; background:#fbb;"
| 16 || May 13 || @ Marlins || 8–2 || Witt (1–2) || Freeman (0–1) || || 33,626 || 11–5
|-  style="text-align:center; background:#bfb;"
| 17 || May 14 || @ Marlins || 6–3 || Ritz (2–0) || Rapp (0–3) || Ruffin (5) || 20,490 || 12–5
|-  style="text-align:center; background:#fbb;"
| 18 || May 15 || @ Braves || 4–0 || Mercker (1–1) || Olivares (1–2) || || 27,009 || 12–6
|-  style="text-align:center; background:#fbb;"
| 19 || May 16 || @ Braves || 15–3 || Smoltz (2–2) || Acevedo (1–2) || || 25,516 || 12–7
|-  style="text-align:center; background:#bfb;"
| 20 || May 17 || @ Braves || 6–5 || Holmes (3–0) || Maddux (2–1) || Ruffin (6) || 27,070 || 13–7
|-  style="text-align:center; background:#fbb;"
| 21 || May 18 || @ Braves || 3–2 || McMichael (3–0) || Munoz (0–1) || Borbón (2) || 26,205 || 13–8
|-  style="text-align:center; background:#fbb;"
| 22 || May 19 || @ Reds || 2–0 || Schourek (1–2) || Ritz (2–1) || Brantley (2) || 25,688 || 13–9
|-  style="text-align:center; background:#fbb;"
| 23 || May 20 || @ Reds || 10–9 (10) || Smith (1–1) || Bailey (2–1) || || 29,401 || 13–10
|-  style="text-align:center; background:#bfb;"
| 24 || May 21 || @ Reds || 5–2 || Acevedo (2–2) || Jarvis (1–2) || Holmes (1) || 23,629 || 14–10
|-  style="text-align:center; background:#bfb;"
| 25 || May 22 || Cubs || 9–8 || Munoz (1–1) || Myers (0–1) || || 47,325 || 15–10
|-  style="text-align:center; background:#fbb;"
| 26 || May 23 || Cubs || 7–6 || Foster (3–2) || Freeman (0–2) || Myers (9) || 43,226 || 15–11
|-  style="text-align:center; background:#fbb;"
| 27 || May 24 || Cubs || 5–3 || Castillo (3–1) || Bailey (2–2) || Myers (10) || 45,367 || 15–12
|-  style="text-align:center; background:#fbb;"
| 28 || May 26 || @ Pirates || 4–2 || Wagner (1–5) || Acevedo (2–3) || Miceli (6) || 11,183 || 15–13
|-  style="text-align:center; background:#fbb;"
| 29 || May 27 || @ Pirates || 9–4 || Neagle (4–1) || Swift (1–1) || || 16,082 || 15–14
|-  style="text-align:center; background:#bfb;"
| 30 || May 28 || @ Pirates || 6–3 || Freeman (1–2) || White (0–1) || Ruffin (7) || 15,016 || 16–14
|-  style="text-align:center; background:#fbb;"
| 31 || May 29 || @ Cardinals || 6–5 (11) || Habyan (1–1) || Bailey (2–3) || || 26,889 || 16–15
|-  style="text-align:center; background:#fbb;"
| 32 || May 30 || @ Cardinals || 8–5 || Hill (4–0) || Grahe (0–1) || Henke (10) || 15,251 || 16–16
|-  style="text-align:center; background:#bfb;"
| 33 || May 31 || @ Cardinals || 5–3 ||  Acevedo (3–3) || Petkovsek (0–1) || Holmes (2) || 19,297 || 17–16
|-

|-  style="text-align:center; background:#bfb;"
| 34 || June 2 || Pirates || 7–4 || Holmes (4–0) || McCurry (0–1) || || 45,828 || 18–16
|-  style="text-align:center; background:#bfb;"
| 35 || June 3 || Pirates || 7–6 || Ritz (3–1) || Lieber (1–5) || Holmes (3) || 48,144 || 19–16
|-  style="text-align:center; background:#bfb;"
| 36 || June 4 || Pirates || 4–1 || Grahe (1–1) || Wagner (1–7) || Leskanic (1) || 48,061 || 20–16
|-  style="text-align:center; background:#fbb;"
| 37 || June 5 || Cardinals || 9–5 || Petkovsek (1–1) || Acevedo (3–4) || || 46,649 || 20–17
|-  style="text-align:center; background:#bfb;"
| 38 || June 6 || Cardinals || 5–4 || Leskanic (2–1) || Parrett (2–2) || || 46,621 || 21–17
|-  style="text-align:center; background:#bfb;"
| 39 || June 7 || Cardinals || 7–3 || Freeman (2–2) || Jackson (0–7) || || 46,704 || 22–17
|-  style="text-align:center; background:#bfb;"
| 40 || June 8 || @ Cubs || 5–3 || Ritz (4–1) || Foster (4–3) || Reed (2) || 24,757 || 23–17
|-  style="text-align:center; background:#bfb;"
| 41 || June 9 || @ Cubs || 2–1 (10) || Holmes (5–0) || Pérez (0–4) || Munoz (1) || 21,905 || 24–17
|-  style="text-align:center; background:#fbb;"
| 42 || June 10 || @ Cubs || 3–0 || Morgan (2–1) || Acevedo (3–5) || Myers (14) || 32,460 || 24–18
|-  style="text-align:center; background:#bfb;"
| 43 || June 11 || @ Cubs || 5–1 || Thompson (2–0) || Trachsel (2–4) || Leskanic (2) || 27,245 || 25–18
|-  style="text-align:center; background:#fbb;"
| 44 || June 12 || Reds || 11–6 || Jarvis (3–3) || Freeman (2–3) || || 47,708 || 25–19
|-  style="text-align:center; background:#bfb;"
| 45 || June 13 || Reds || 6–4 || Ritz (5–1) || Pugh (4–1) || Leskanic (3) || 48,198 || 26–19
|-  style="text-align:center; background:#bfb;"
| 46 || June 14 || Reds || 10–4 || Grahe (2–1) || Schourek (4–3) || || 48,255 || 27–19
|-  style="text-align:center; background:#fbb;"
| 47 || June 16 || Braves || 2–0 || Glavine (5–3) || Swift (1–2) || || 48,163 || 27–20
|-  style="text-align:center; background:#fbb;"
| 48 || June 17 || Braves || 7–1 || Avery (2–4) || Acevedo (3–6) || || 50,035 || 27–21
|-  style="text-align:center; background:#fbb;"
| 49 || June 18 || Braves || 9–4 || Mercker (4–3) || Freeman (2–4) || || 48,302 || 27–22
|-  style="text-align:center; background:#fbb;"
| 50 || June 19 || Marlins || 7–2 || Hammond (4–1) || Ritz (5–2) || || 48,145 || 27–23
|-  style="text-align:center; background:#fbb;"
| 51 || June 20 || Marlins || 7–2 || Mathews (2–0) || Grahe (2–2) || || 48,143 || 27–24
|-  style="text-align:center; background:#bfb;"
| 52 || June 21 || Marlins || 6–3 || Swift (2–2) || Rapp (2–4) || Reed (3) || 48,117 || 28–24
|-  style="text-align:center; background:#bfb;"
| 53 || June 22 || @ Padres || 3–2 || Reynoso (1–0) || Dishman (0–1) || Ruffin (8) || 11,653 || 29–24
|-  style="text-align:center; background:#fbb;"
| 54 || June 23 || @ Padres || 3–2 || Ashby (4–4) || Freeman (2–5) || Hoffman (10) || 15,418 || 29–25
|-  style="text-align:center; background:#fbb;"
| 55 || June 24 || @ Padres || 2–0 || Hamilton (3–2) || Ritz (5–3) || || 36,137 || 29–26
|-  style="text-align:center; background:#bfb;"
| 56 || June 25 || @ Padres || 11–3 || Grahe (3–2) || Sanders (5–4) || || 20,776 || 30–26
|-  style="text-align:center; background:#bfb;"
| 57 || June 27 || @ Giants || 5–1 || Swift (3–2) || Bautista (2–4) || || 14,769 || 31–26
|-  style="text-align:center; background:#fbb;"
| 58 || June 28 || @ Giants || 2–1 (11) || Barton (1–0) || Munoz (1–2) || || 15,136 || 31–27
|-  style="text-align:center; background:#fbb;"
| 59 || June 29 || @ Dodgers || 3–0 || Nomo (6–1) || Freeman (2–6) || || 46,295 || 31–28
|-  style="text-align:center; background:#bfb;"
| 60 || June 30 || @ Dodgers || 2–1 || Ritz (6–3) || Candiotti (4–6) || Munoz (2) || 34,253 || 32–28
|-

|-  style="text-align:center; background:#fbb;"
| 61 || July 1 || @ Dodgers || 5–4 || Worrell (2–0) || Bailey (2–4) || || 54,006 || 32–29
|-  style="text-align:center; background:#bfb;"
| 62 || July 2 || @ Dodgers || 10–1 || Swift (4–2) || Martínez (7–6) || || 37,354 || 33–29
|-  style="text-align:center; background:#bfb;"
| 63 || July 3 || Astros || 15–10 || Bailey (3–4) || Dougherty (3–1) || Holmes (4) || 50,028 || 34–29
|-  style="text-align:center; background:#fbb;"
| 64 || July 4 || Astros || 16–8 || Hampton (3–3) || Olivares (1–3) || || 50,127 || 34–30
|-  style="text-align:center; background:#bfb;"
| 65 || July 5 || Astros || 4–2 || Ritz (7–3) || Kile (3–8) || Holmes (5) || 48,091 || 35–30
|-  style="text-align:center; background:#bfb;"
| 66 || July 6 || Expos || 9–6 || Grahe (4–2) || Fassero (8–6) || Holmes (6) || 48,073 || 36–30
|-  style="text-align:center; background:#bfb;"
| 67 || July 7 || Expos || 12–7 || Acevedo (4–6) || Heredia (3–5) || || 50,111 || 37–30
|-  style="text-align:center; background:#bfb;"
| 68 || July 8 || Expos || 8–3 || Reynoso (2–0) || Henry (3–7) || Leskanic (4) || 48,190 || 38–30
|-  style="text-align:center; background:#bfb;"
| 69 || July 9 || Expos || 4–1 || Freeman (3–6) || Martínez (6–5) || || 48,114 || 39–30
|-  style="text-align:center; background:#fbb;"
| 70 || July 13 || @ Mets || 4–2 || Jones (5–6) || Ritz (7–4) || Franco (10) || 15,276 || 39–31
|-  style="text-align:center; background:#fbb;"
| 71 || July 14 || @ Mets || 13–4 || Pulsipher (2–4) || Reynoso (2–1) || || 15,377 || 39–32
|-  style="text-align:center; background:#bfb;"
| 72 || July 15 || @ Mets || 5–4 || Swift (5–2) || Saberhagen (5–5) || Holmes (7) || 17,120 || 40–32
|-  style="text-align:center; background:#fbb;"
| 73 || July 16 || @ Mets || 2–1 (10) || Franco (4–1) || Thompson (2–1) || || 25,994 || 40–33
|-  style="text-align:center; background:#bfb;"
| 74 || July 17 || Phillies || 8–5 || Munoz (2–2) || Bottalico (3–2) || Holmes (8) || 48,070 || 41–33
|-  style="text-align:center; background:#fbb;"
| 75 || July 18 || Phillies || 7–5 || Schilling (7–5) || Ritz (7–5) || Slocumb (22) || 48,011 || 41–34
|-  style="text-align:center; background:#bfb;"
| 76 || July 19 || Phillies || 5–3 || Rekar (1–0) || Green (8–6) || Holmes (9) || 48,087 || 42–34
|-  style="text-align:center; background:#bfb;"
| 77 || July 20 || Phillies || 7–3 || Swift (6–2) || Quantrill (7–6) || || 48,037 || 43–34
|-  style="text-align:center; background:#fbb;"
| 78 || July 21 || Mets || 12–1 || Harnisch (2–7) || Reynoso (2–2) || || 48,059 || 43–35
|-  style="text-align:center; background:#bfb;"
| 79 || July 22 || Mets || 5–4 || Leskanic (3–1) || Henry (1–4) || Holmes (10) || 48,042 || 44–35
|-  style="text-align:center; background:#bfb;"
| 80 || July 23 || Mets || 8–5 || Ritz (8–5) || Jones (6–7) || Holmes (11) || 48,129 || 45–35
|-  style="text-align:center; background:#bfb;"
| 81 || July 24 || @ Phillies || 11–3 || Rekar (2–0) || Green (8–7) || || 25,424 || 46–35
|-  style="text-align:center; background:#fbb;"
| 82 || July 25 || @ Phillies || 7–6 (10) || Slocumb (2–0) || Munoz (2–3) || || 25,837 || 46–36
|-  style="text-align:center; background:#fbb;"
| 83 || July 26 || @ Astros || 4–3 || Kile (4–10) || Reynoso (2–3) || Jones (9) || 19,209 || 46–37
|-  style="text-align:center; background:#fbb;"
| 84 || July 27 || @ Astros || 5–4 (12) || Jones (6–1) || Munoz (2–4) || || 21,734 || 46–38
|-  style="text-align:center; background:#bfb;"
| 85 || July 28 || @ Expos || 8–3 || Ritz (9–5) || Urbina (2–2) || || 19,221 || 47–38
|-  style="text-align:center; background:#bfb;"
| 86 || July 29 || @ Expos || 5–3 || Rekar (3–0) || Fassero (10–8) || Holmes (12) || 23,595 || 48–38
|-  style="text-align:center; background:#fbb;"
| 87 || July 30 || @ Expos || 11–4 || Martínez (9–6) || Freeman (3–7) || || 27,172 || 48–39
|-  style="text-align:center; background:#bfb;"
| 88 || July 31 || @ Expos || 3–2 || Reynoso (3–3) || Henry (6–8) || Holmes (13) || 14,978 || 49–39
|-

|-  style="text-align:center; background:#fbb;"
| 89 || August 1 || Dodgers || 9–6 || Valdez (8–6) || Thompson (2–2) || Worrell (19) || 48,071 || 49–40
|-  style="text-align:center; background:#fbb;"
| 90 || August 2 || Dodgers || 10–7 || Tapani (7–11) || Ritz (9–6) || || 48,063 || 49–41
|-  style="text-align:center; background:#bfb;"
| 91 || August 3 || Dodgers || 9–4 || Saberhagen (6–5) || Martínez (11–7) || || 48,024 || 50–41
|-  style="text-align:center; background:#bfb;"
| 92 || August 4 || Padres || 14–12 || Reed (2–1) || Berumen (2–3) || Holmes (14) || 48,125 || 51–41
|-  style="text-align:center; background:#bfb;"
| 93 || August 5 || Padres || 7–3 || Reynoso (4–3) || Ashby (7–6) || || 48,043 || 52–41
|-  style="text-align:center; background:#fbb;"
| 94 || August 6 || Padres || 16–8 || Dishman (3–4) || Thompson (2–3) || || 48,157 || 52–42
|-  style="text-align:center; background:#fbb;"
| 95 || August 8 || @ Marlins || 5–4 (13) || Groom (2–3) || Bailey (3–5) || || 31,220 || 52–43
|-  style="text-align:center; background:#fbb;"
| 96 || August 9 || @ Marlins || 2–1 || Burkett (10–10) || Ritz (9–7) || Nen (13) || 31,805 || 52–44
|-  style="text-align:center; background:#fbb;"
| 97 || August 10 || @ Marlins || 3–2 || Peña (3–1) || Reed (2–2) || || 28,009 || 52–45
|-  style="text-align:center; background:#fbb;"
| 98 || August 11 || @ Braves || 5–3 || Avery (5–8) || Reynoso (4–4) || Wohlers (16) || 47,408 || 52–46
|-  style="text-align:center; background:#bfb;"
| 99 || August 12 || @ Braves || 16–4 || Leskanic (4–1) || Mercker (6–7) || || 48,777 || 53–46
|-  style="text-align:center; background:#fbb;"
| 100 || August 13 || @ Braves || 3–2 || Wohlers (6–3) || Holmes (5–1) || || 43,279 || 53–47
|-  style="text-align:center; background:#fbb;"
| 101 || August 14 || @ Reds || 4–0 || Burba (7–2) || Ritz (9–8) || || 23,945 || 53–48
|-  style="text-align:center; background:#fbb;"
| 102 || August 15 || @ Reds || 11–3 || Portugal (6–8) || Rekar (3–1) || || 24,506 || 53–49
|-  style="text-align:center; background:#bfb;"
| 103 || August 16 || @ Reds || 6–4 || Reynoso (5–4) || Smiley (11–2) || Painter (1) || 25,024 || 54–49
|-  style="text-align:center; background:#bfb;"
| 104 || August 17 || Cubs || 12–5 || Bailey (4–5) || Navarro (10–5) || || 48,071 || 55–49
|-  style="text-align:center; background:#fbb;"
| 105 || August 18 || Cubs || 26–7 || Young (2–4) || Saberhagen (6–6) || || 48,082 || 55–50
|-  style="text-align:center; background:#fbb;"
| 106 || August 19 || Cubs || 6–5 || Castillo (8–6) || Ritz (9–9) || Myers (28) || 48,020t || 55–51
|-  style="text-align:center; background:#bfb;"
| 107 || August 20 || Cubs || 4–2 || Leskanic (5–1) || Wendell (2–1) || || 50,087 || 56–51
|-  style="text-align:center; background:#fbb;"
| 108 || August 22 || Pirates || 10–1 || Loaiza (8–5) || Reynoso (5–5) || || 48,083 || 56–52
|-  style="text-align:center; background:#bfb;"
| 109 || August 23 || Pirates || 9–5 || Bailey (5–5) || Neagle (11–6) || || 48,027 || 57–52
|-  style="text-align:center; background:#bfb;"
| 110 || August 24 || Pirates || 8–6 || Painter (1–0) || Wagner (2–12) || Leskanic (5) || 48,041 || 58–52
|-  style="text-align:center; background:#fbb;"
| 111 || August 25 || Cardinals || 8–3 || Morgan (5–7) || Rekar (3–2) || Mathews (1) || 48,012 || 58–53
|-  style="text-align:center; background:#fbb;"
| 112 || August 26 || Cardinals || 5–4 || Fossas (3–0) || Ruffin (0–1) || Henke (28) || 48,127 || 58–54
|-  style="text-align:center; background:#fbb;"
| 113 || August 27 || Cardinals || 10–5 || Barber (2–0) || Reynoso (5–6) || || 48,043 || 58–55
|-  style="text-align:center; background:#bfb;"
| 114 || August 28 || @ Pirates || 6–3 || Bailey (6–5) || Powell (0–2) || Leskanic (6) || 8,242 || 59–55
|-  style="text-align:center; background:#fbb;"
| 115 || August 29 || @ Pirates || 4–0 || Wagner (3–13) || Ritz (9–10) || || 7,634 || 59–56
|-  style="text-align:center; background:#bfb;"
| 116 || August 30 || @ Pirates || 6–0 || Rekar (4–2) || Ericks (3–7) || || 8,120 || 60–56
|-

|-  style="text-align:center; background:#fbb;"
| 117 || September 1 || @ Cardinals || 5–4 || DeLucia (7–6) || Leskanic (5–2) || Henke (30) || 21,164 || 60–57
|-  style="text-align:center; background:#bfb;"
| 118 || September 2 || @ Cardinals || 6–1 || Bailey (7–5) || Watson (5–7) || || 26,796 || 61–57
|-  style="text-align:center; background:#bfb;"
| 119 || September 3 || @ Cardinals || 5–4 (11) || Holmes (6–1) || Parrett (3–5) || Ruffin (9) || 22,188 || 62–57
|-  style="text-align:center; background:#fbb;"
| 120 || September 4 || @ Cubs || 2–0 || Castillo (9–8) || Rekar (4–3) || || 31,601 || 62–58
|-  style="text-align:center; background:#bfb;"
| 121 || September 6 || @ Cubs || 10–4 || Reynoso (6–6) || Bullinger (11–6) || || 23,034 || 63–58
|-  style="text-align:center; background:#bfb;"
| 122 || September 8 || Reds || 10–5 || Leskanic (6–2) || Carrasco (2–6) || || 48,026 || 64–58
|-  style="text-align:center; background:#bfb;"
| 123 || September 9 || Reds || 6–2 || Swift (7–2) || Wells (14–6) || Ritz (1) || 48,085 || 65–58
|-  style="text-align:center; background:#bfb;"
| 124 || September 10 || Reds || 5–4 || Reed (3–2) || Carrasco (2–7) || Leskanic (7) || 48,074 || 66–58
|-  style="text-align:center; background:#bfb;"
| 125 || September 11 || Braves || 5–4 (12) || Hickerson (3–3) || Woodall (1–1) || || 48,056 || 67–58
|-  style="text-align:center; background:#bfb;"
| 126 || September 12 || Braves || 12–2 || Painter (2–0) || Avery (6–13) || Ritz (2) || 48,013 || 68–58
|-  style="text-align:center; background:#fbb;"
| 127 || September 13 || Braves || 9–7 || Schmidt (2–0) || Bailey (7–6) || || 48,011 || 68–59
|-  style="text-align:center; background:#bfb;"
| 128 || September 15 || Marlins || 6–3 || Reed (4–2) || Burkett (13–12) || Leskanic (8) || 48,010 || 69–59
|-  style="text-align:center; background:#bfb;"
| 129 || September 16 || Marlins || 8–7 || Reed (5–2) || Mathews (4–4) || Ruffin (10) || 48,037 || 70–59
|-  style="text-align:center; background:#fbb;"
| 130 || September 17 || Marlins || 17–0 || Rapp (12–7) || Rekar (4–4) || || 48,035 || 70–60
|-  style="text-align:center; background:#bfb;"
| 131 || September 18 || @ Padres || 5–1 || Ritz (10–10) || Hamilton (6–9) || Ruffin (11) || 10,596 || 71–60
|-  style="text-align:center; background:#fbb;"
| 132 || September 19 || @ Padres || 15–4 || Blair (7–4) || Reynoso (6–7) || || 10,321 || 71–61
|-  style="text-align:center; background:#bfb;"
| 133 || September 20 || @ Padres || 10–2 || Swift (8–2) || Dishman (4–8) || || 10,095 || 72–61
|-  style="text-align:center; background:#fbb;"
| 134 || September 21 || @ Giants || 5–3 || Valdez (4–4) || Grahe (4–3) || Beck (31) || 12,968 || 72–62
|-  style="text-align:center; background:#bfb;"
| 135 || September 22 || @ Giants || 6–1 || Ritz (11–10) || Estes (0–2) || || 17,723 || 73–62
|-  style="text-align:center; background:#fbb;"
| 136 || September 23 || @ Giants || 2–0 || Brewington (5–4) || Rekar (4–5) || Beck (32) || 28,538 || 73–63
|-  style="text-align:center; background:#bfb;"
| 137 || September 24 || @ Giants || 3–1 || Reynoso (7–7) || Leiter (10–11) || Leskanic (9) || 34,472 || 74–63
|-  style="text-align:center; background:#fbb;"
| 138 || September 25 || @ Dodgers || 4–3 || Martínez (17–7) || Swift (8–3) || Worrell (31) || 41,984 || 74–64
|-  style="text-align:center; background:#bfb;"
| 139 || September 26 || @ Dodgers || 7–3 || Saberhagen (7–6) || Candiotti (7–14) || || 44,415 || 75–64
|-  style="text-align:center; background:#fbb;"
| 140 || September 27 || @ Dodgers || 7–4 || Tapani (10–13) || Ritz (11–11) || Worrell (32) || 53,856 || 75–65
|-  style="text-align:center; background:#fbb;"
| 141 || September 28 || Giants || 12–4 || Brewington (6–4) || Rekar (4–6) || || 48,023 || 75–66
|-  style="text-align:center; background:#fbb;"
| 142 || September 29 || Giants || 10–7 || Service (3–1) || Leskanic (6–3) || Beck (33) || 48,017 || 75–67
|-  style="text-align:center; background:#bfb;"
| 143 || September 30 || Giants || 9–3 || Swift (9–3) || Mulholland (5–13) || || 48,023 || 76–67
|-

|-  style="text-align:center; background:#bfb;"
| 144 || October 1 || Giants || 10–9 || Painter (3–0) || Leiter (10–12) || Leskanic (10) || 48,039 || 77–67
|-

Playoffs

|-  style="text-align:center; background:#fbb;"
| 1 || October 3 || Braves || 4–5 || Peña (1–0) || Leskanic (0–1) || Wohlers (1) || 50,040 || 0–1
|-  style="text-align:center; background:#fbb;"
| 2 || October 4 || Braves || 4–7 || Peña (2–0) || Munoz (0–1) || Wohlers (2) || 50,063 || 0–2
|-  style="text-align:center; background:#bfb;"
| 3 || October 6 || @ Braves || 7–5 (10) || Holmes (1–0) || Wohlers (0–1) ||  Thompson (1) || 51,300 || 1–2
|-  style="text-align:center; background:#fbb;"
| 4 || October 7 || @ Braves || 4–10 || Maddux (1–0) || Saberhagen (0–1) || || 50,027 || 1–3 
|-

Player stats

Batting

Starters by position 
Note: Pos = Position; G = Games played; AB = At bats; H = Hits; Avg. = Batting average; HR = Home runs; RBI = Runs batted in

Other batters 
Note: G = Games played; AB = At bats; H = Hits; Avg. = Batting average; HR = Home runs; RBI = Runs batted in

Pitching

Starting pitchers 
Note: G = Games pitched; IP = Innings pitched; W = Wins; L = Losses; ERA = Earned run average; SO = Strikeouts

Other pitchers 
Note: G = Games pitched; IP = Innings pitched; W = Wins; L = Losses; ERA = Earned run average; SO = Strikeouts

Relief pitchers 
Note: G = Games pitched; W = Wins; L = Losses; SV = Saves; ERA = Earned run average; SO = Strikeouts

Farm system 

LEAGUE CHAMPIONS: Colorado Springs

References

1995 Colorado Rockies at Baseball Reference
1995 Colorado Rockies team page at www.baseball-almanac.com

Colorado Rockies seasons
Colorado Rockies
Colorado Rockies season
1990s in Denver